Hoje is a 2011 Brazilian drama film directed by Tata Amaral, based on the book "Prova Contrária", by Fernando Bonassi. The film was the winner of the 44th Festival de Brasília in 2011.

Starring Denise Fraga, the film tells the story of Vera, a woman who fought against the military dictatorship in Brazil and began to receive a compensation from the Government for the disappearance of her husband by Brazil's brutal military dictatorship, which arrested and tortured thousands and killed or "disappeared" many of its victims.

Plot 
Ex-political activist receives compensation from the Brazilian Government for the disappearance of her husband, victim of repression unleashed by the Brazilian military government dictatorship. With the money, she can buy the so dreamed apartment and free herself of the condition of suspension in which she lived for decades, when she was not even officially recognized as widow. When moving to the new home, she receives a visit that will change her life.

Cast 
 Denise Fraga	
 César Troncoso	
 João Baldasserini	
 Lorena Lobato	
 Cláudia Assunção	
 Pedro Abhull

References

External links 
 

2011 drama films
2011 films
Brazilian drama films
Films about Brazilian military dictatorship
Films based on Brazilian novels
2010s Portuguese-language films